"The Hero's Return" is a song by Pink Floyd from their 1983 album, The Final Cut.

Like many tracks included on The Final Cut, "The Hero's Return" had – under its original title "Teacher, Teacher" – been previously rejected from The Wall. Guitarist David Gilmour was opposed to this recycling of songs, believing that if they "weren't good enough for The Wall, why are they good enough now?"

Like many other tracks on The Final Cut, "The Hero's Return" featured anti-war lyrics. The lyrics of "The Hero's Return" are almost entirely rewritten from its "Teacher, Teacher" demo version.

Retitled as "The Hero's Return (Parts 1 and 2)" with an extra verse absent from The Final Cut version, the song was released as the B-side of "Not Now John", also from The Final Cut, in 1983. Despite not being released as an A-side to a single, "The Hero's Return" charted at #31 on the Billboard Mainstream Rock chart in America.

Credits 
 Roger Waters – lead vocals, bass, synthesiser, tape effects, acoustic guitar
 David Gilmour – lead and rhythm guitar
 Nick Mason – drums, percussion

with:

 Andy Bown – Yamaha electric piano

References

1980s ballads
1983 songs
Pink Floyd songs
Hard rock ballads
Anti-war songs
Songs written by Roger Waters
Song recordings produced by Roger Waters
The Wall (rock opera)
Songs about soldiers